Dyschirius impunctipennis is a species of ground beetle in the subfamily Scaritinae. It was described by Dawson in 1854.

References

impunctipennis
Beetles described in 1854